Edmond Langevin (30 August 1824 – 2 June 1889) was a Canadian Roman Catholic priest and vicar general.

Born in Quebec City, Lower Canada, Langevin studied at the Petit Séminaire de Québec and the Grand Séminaire. He was ordained priest in 1847. He was appointed vicar general by Charles-François Baillargeon in 1867.

References

1824 births
1889 deaths
19th-century Canadian Roman Catholic priests